Shang Shun Mall is a shopping mall complex in Toufen, Miaoli County, Taiwan that opened in May 2015. It is the first and largest shopping mall in Miaoli County. The main core stores of the mall include Studio A, Uniqlo, Daiso, Xiaomi and various themed restaurants. The mall is a part of an entertainment complex that includes a mall, an entertainment park as well as a 210-room hotel.

See also
 List of tourist attractions in Taiwan

References

External links

2015 establishments in Taiwan
Amusement parks in Taiwan
Buildings and structures in Miaoli County
Shopping malls in Taiwan
Shopping malls established in 2015
Toufen City